Abbas Chamanian (born May 10, 1963) is an Iranian football coach who is AFC certified and currently head coach of Iran national under-17 football team. He is also a university lecturer who teaches Physical Education courses at Ferdowsi University of Mashhad, Islamic Azad University of Mashhad and Mashhad University of Medical Sciences.
He has numerous years of experience at club level and international level.

Managerial career

Club Level
FC Aboomoslem U23 Team 1996-1997 and a member of the Technical Board during various years.
Payam Khorasan U23 Team 1997-1998
Also Head Coach of many teams from Mashhad: Basij Mashhad, Turbo Mashhad, Fajr Mashhad, Pars-Khodro Mashhad, Fath Khorasan and Payam Khorasan.
Mashhad University of Medical Sciences 1991–present

National & International
Khorasan Province under-17 Team 1990
Khorasan Province under-20 1993-1994
Khorasan Province under-23 Team 1995
Iran national under-17 football team 2003-2004
Iran national under-20 football team 2002,2004
Iran Universities National Team 2003,2005

Honours 
 Runner Up Khorasan Province Youth Team in 1990
 Fourth Place Iran national under-20 football team in 2004
 Fifth Place Iran Universities National Team in 2003 World University Games in Seoul.
 Runner up Iran u17 national team in AFC U16 CHAMPIONSHIP in 2016 India

References 
 MUMS bio
 2003 University Games bio

1963 births
Living people
Sportspeople from Mashhad
Iranian football managers
Iran national under-20 football team managers